Mudragada Padmanabham is an Indian politician, an ex-Member of Parliament from Kakinada, and political activist known for campaigning for the inclusion of the Kapu (caste) in the Backward Class (BC) category.

Early life
Mudragada Padmanabham was born in a Telugu Kapu family in Kirlampudi Village, East Godavari District, Andhra Pradesh. His father's name was Veera Raghava Rao. Padmanabham finished his schooling in his village. His father was elected as an Independent MLA in Prattipadu two times, in 1962 and 1967. He was known as Kirlampudi Munciff.

Career
Mudragada Padmanabham was a four-time Member of Legislative Assembly, one-time Member of Parliament and Minister in Telugu Desam Party and Indian National Congress governments. He started his political career as Janata Party MLA in 1978. Later, when N. T. Rama Rao started Telugu Desam Party in 1982, he joined and won both 1983 and 1985 elections from Prattipadu Assembly constituency in East Godavari District.

He resigned his Ministry in N. T. Rama Rao's cabinet and started Praja Rakshana Samiti. Later, he started the Telugu Nadu Party with K. E. Krishnamurthy and Kunduru Jana Reddy, who are now with the Telugu Desam and the Congress, respectively. In 1988, he hosted a reception at Prattipadu for the late Rajiv Gandhi, then Prime Minister. He was elected as an MLA and also held a Ministerial berth.

He lost for the first time as an MLA in 1994 and did not contest again from Prattipadu constituency. He later associated himself with Kapunadu and later with the Bharatiya Janata Party (BJP). While working with BJP, he played a key role in the election of Krishnam Raju from Kakinada.

He was with BJP for 4 years. He attended Rashtriya Swayamsevak Sangh Sakhas during this period. Later in 1999, he represented Telugu Desam in the Lok Sabha from Kakinada and then lost in 2004 elections from the same constituency.

References

External links
Myneta.ifo

Year of birth missing (living people)
Living people
India MPs 1999–2004
Bharatiya Janata Party politicians from Andhra Pradesh
Indian National Congress politicians from Andhra Pradesh
Janata Party politicians
Lok Sabha members from Andhra Pradesh
Members of the Andhra Pradesh Legislative Assembly
People from East Godavari district
State cabinet ministers of Andhra Pradesh
Telugu Desam Party politicians